is the first album by Kaku P-Model, a solo continuation of P-Model led by Susumu Hirasawa.

Overview
Vistoron has a dystopian theme, something that was especially prominent in Hirasawa's work for a number of years starting with 2003's Blue Limbo. The album's science fiction concept story is about mass media sending out "Anti-Vistoron" to show people false images of the world, and Hirasawa's investigation of the mysterious "Ashu-on" lifeform.

Track listing

"Adore me, I am TV" contains a sample of the 2002 State of the Union Address, delivered by then-President of the United States of America George W. Bush.
"Cruise Psyclaon" contains a sample of "Cultivation" by Susumu Hirasawa, from the album Paranoia Agent Original Soundtrack.
"Vistoron" contains a sample of min'yō-style singing, performed by Hiroshi Harada, on "Skeleton Coast Park" by Susumu Hirasawa, from the album Water in Time and Space.

References

External links
 Vistoron

Susumu Hirasawa albums
2004 debut albums